This is a list of members of the National Parliament of Papua New Guinea from 2002 to 2007 as elected at the 2002 election.

Notes

References

List
Papua New Guinea politics-related lists